Thyrostroma compactum is a plant pathogen in the family Botryosphaeriaceae.

References

External links 
 Index Fungorum
 USDA ARS Fungal Database

Fungal plant pathogens and diseases
Botryosphaeriaceae
Fungi described in 1876